The Copa del Generalísimo 1968 Final was the 66th final of the King's Cup. The final was played on 11 July 1968 at the Santiago Bernabéu Stadium in Madrid, and was won by FC Barcelona, who beat Real Madrid CF 1–0.

Details

See also
El Clásico

References

1968
Copa
Real Madrid CF matches
FC Barcelona matches
El Clásico matches